Tell Me may refer to:

 Tell Me..., a 1979 album by Jimmy Knepper
 Tell me (advertisement), a 2005 Chinese-language newspaper ad calling for universal suffrage in Hong Kong
 Tell Me (TV series), a 2019 South Korean quiz show
 Tellme Networks, a defunct American telecommunications company owned by Microsoft
 Dis-moi, a 1980 documentary film by Chantal Akerman
 Tell Me, a 2005 short film by Shandi Mitchell
 Tell Me, a 2008 short film starring Sean Paul Lockhart

Songs 
 "Tell Me!" (August and Telma song), representing Iceland at Eurovision 2000
 "Tell Me" (Billie Myers song), 1998
 "Tell Me" (Bobby Valentino song), 2005
 "Tell Me" (Diddy song), 2006
 "Tell Me" (Dru Hill song), 1996
 "Tell Me" (Groove Theory song), 1995
 "Tell Me" (hide song), 1994
 "Tell Me" (Jake Owen song), 2010
 "Tell Me" (Mel B song), 2000
 "Tell Me" (Rolling Stones song), 1964
 "Tell Me" (Sandy Mölling song), 2004
 "Tell Me" (Smilez and Southstar song), 2002
 "Tell Me" (White Lion song), 1988
 "Tell Me" (Wonder Girls song), 2007
 "Tell Me (I'll Be Around)", by Shades, 1996
 "Drops of Jupiter (Tell Me)", by Train, 2001
 "Tell Me", by Adelitas Way from Notorious
 "Tell Me", by Aerosmith from Music from Another Dimension!
 "Tell Me", by Belinda Carlisle from Real
 "Tell Me", by Big Tymers from How You Luv That Vol. 2
 "Tell Me", by Bing Crosby from Bing with a Beat
 "Tell Me", by Bob Dylan from The Bootleg Series Volumes 1–3 (Rare & Unreleased) 1961–1991
 "Tell Me", by Boston from Greatest Hits
 "Tell Me", by Broderick Jones, which represented Kansas in the American Song Contest
 "Tell Me", by Carly Rae Jepsen from Tug Of War
 "Tell Me", by Case from Personal Conversation
 "Tell Me", by Chaz Jankel from Chazablanca
 "Tell Me", by Cliff Richard from Me and My Shadows
 "Tell Me", by Clyde McPhatter
 "Tell Me", by Corey Hart from Corey Hart
 "Tell Me", by Corinne Bailey Rae from The Heart Speaks in Whispers
 "Tell Me", by Destiny's Child from Destiny's Child
 "Tell Me", by Dick and Dee Dee
 "Tell Me", by Dropping Daylight from Brace Yourself, 2006
 "Tell Me", by Galaxie 500 from On Fire
 "Tell Me", by Gerardo from Dos
 "Tell Me", by Goldfinger from Open Your Eyes
 "Tell Me", by Gotthard from Firebirth
 "Tell Me", by The Grass Roots from Where Were You When I Needed You
 "Tell Me", by Hanna-McEuen from Hanna-McEuen
 "Tell Me", by Howlin' Wolf from Howlin' Wolf
 "Tell Me", by Infinite from Top Seed
 "Tell Me", by Inna from Inna
 "Tell Me", by Joey Albert
 "Tell Me", by Kaskade from Redux EP 002
 "Tell Me", by Laleh from Laleh
 "Tell Me", by Lasgo from Far Away
 "Tell Me", by Lil' Flip from I Need Mine
 "Tell Me", by Lionel Richie from Can't Slow Down: 20th Anniversary Deluxe Edition
 "Tell Me", by Lost Frequencies
 "Tell Me", by Mark 'Oh
 "Tell Me", by Marshmello from Joytime II
 "Tell Me", by Nick Kamen
 "Tell Me", by Pat Benatar from Go
 "Tell Me", by Pseudo Echo from Love an Adventure
 "Tell Me", by Roam from Backbone
 "Tell Me", by Sara Evans from Real Fine Place
 "Tell Me", by Terry Kath
 "Tell Me", by Tiësto (as Clear View) from In Search of Sunrise 6: Ibiza
 "Tell Me", by Toni Braxton from More Than a Woman
 "Tell Me", by Total from Total
 "Tell Me", by Why Don't We
 "Tell Me", by Wretch 32 from FR32
 "Tell Me", written by Arthur Korb and Milton Yakus
 "Tell Me (P.A.C.)", by Story of the Year from The Black Swan

See also
 "Dime" (Ivy Queen song) (Spanish for "Tell Me"), a song by Ivy Queen
 Tell Me How (disambiguation)
 Tell Me Why (disambiguation)